Macroscope may refer to:
 "Macroscope", a type of optical microscope marketed initially by Wild and subsequently by Leica Microsystems.
 Macroscope, a science concept antithetical to "microscope".
 Macroscope (methodology suite), a computer program that is a methodology suite by Fujitsu
 Macroscope (novel), a 1969 novel by Piers Anthony.
 Macroscope (album), a 2014 album by the Nels Cline Singers

See also
 Macroscopic scale
 Macroscopic limit
 Optical microscope
 Earth observation